The 1980 South African Grand Prix was a Formula One motor race held on 1 March 1980 at Kyalami in Gauteng, South Africa. It was the third round of the 1980 Formula One season. The race was the twenty-sixth South African Grand Prix and the fourteenth to be held at Kyalami. The race was held over 78 laps of the 4.104-kilometre circuit for a total race distance of 320 kilometres.

The race was won by French driver René Arnoux driving a Renault RE20. It was Arnoux' second World Championship victory adding to his win at the previous race the 1980 Brazilian Grand Prix. Arnoux won by 34 seconds over fellow French driver Jacques Laffite driving a Ligier JS11/15. Laffite's Ligier teammate Didier Pironi was third, completing an all-French podium. This was the first race since the 1968 United States Grand Prix to have three drivers from the same country on the podium; all three were also driving French-built cars.

The race was additionally notable because of two accidents during qualifying: French driver Alain Prost broke his wrist when he crashed his McLaren M29 at the Esses after a suspension failure, while Swiss driver Marc Surer badly injured his legs when he crashed the new ATS D4 at Crowthorne Corner at the end of the straight. Neither started the race, with Prost also missing the following race and Surer the next three races. ATS had only just downsized from two entries to one, but with Surer injured the former #2 driver Dutchman Jan Lammers rejoined the team. The new ATS D4 was too heavily damaged to be repaired and leaving Lammers to try and fail to qualify an ATS D3.

In common with the previous race in Brazil, altitude gave the turbo-charged Renaults a dominant edge in speed. Third on the grid, Nelson Piquet was almost two seconds behind in qualifying in his Brabham BT49. Jean-Pierre Jabouille and Arnoux led for much of the race until Jabouille punctured. The Ligiers climbed into the podium positions as championship leader Alan Jones retired his Williams FW07B. Piquet finished fourth ahead of Carlos Reutemann in the second Williams. The final point was claimed by Jochen Mass in his Arrows A3.

Thirteen cars finished the race although Patrick Depailler's Alfa Romeo 179 was too far behind to be classified. Geoff Lees was classified 13th as he crashed his Shadow DN11 late in the race. This would be Shadow's last Grand Prix start (not counting the non-championship Spanish GP three months later).

Arnoux became the new championship points leader, five points up on Jones and nine ahead of Piquet. Similarly Renault now led the constructors points over Williams.

Classification

Qualifying

Race

Championship standings after the race

Drivers' Championship standings

Constructors' Championship standings

Note: Only the top five positions are included for both sets of standings.

References

South African Grand Prix
South African Grand Prix
Grand Prix
March 1980 sports events in Africa